Robert Grey (born 21 April 1951) is an English musician best known as the drummer for Wire. He is sometimes credited as Robert Gotobed.

Career
In 1973, Grey joined his first band, an R&B group called the Snakes, as vocalist. The Snakes released one single, "Teenage Head". After the group folded, Grey began teaching himself to drum.

He has been Wire's regular drummer since their start in 1976; at first he used the stage name 'Robert Gotobed'. Grey left the band in 1990, after the release of the album Manscape, because of Wire's increasing use of sequencers, computers, and drum machines. He began to feel uncomfortable as the band moved further into a computer-based environment. After his departure, the band dropped one letter from its name, becoming "Wir". Grey started exploring African drumming and devoted his time to organic agriculture, running a small farm in The Midlands, England.

He rejoined Wire in 2000, dropping his Robert Gotobed alias and using his birthname Robert Grey. He has recorded and toured with the band since.

References

1951 births
English punk rock drummers
Living people
Wire (band) members
People from Harborough District